The Roman Catholic Diocese of Beverley is an historical diocese of the Roman Catholic Church in England. It took its name after the town of Beverley in the East Riding of Yorkshire, although the episcopal see was located in the city of York. The diocese was established in 1850 and was replaced by two dioceses in 1878: Middlesbrough and Leeds. It was restored as a titular see in 1969.

History 
The Apostolic Vicariate of the Yorkshire District was created out of the Northern District on 11 May 1840. As its name implied, it comprised most of the Yorkshire area.

On the restoration of the hierarchy in England and Wales by Pope Pius IX, the Yorkshire District was elevated to the Diocese of Beverley on 29 September 1850. The pro-cathedral was located first at St George's, York, and then at St Wilfrid's, York. Twenty-eight years later, the diocese was suppressed on 20 December 1878 and its area was divided into the dioceses of Leeds and Middlesbrough.

Titular see 
The titular see of Beverley (latine: Beverlacum) was restored by the Roman Catholic Church in 1969. The current titular bishop is the Right Reverend John Hine, who serves as an Auxiliary Bishop in the Archdiocese of Southwark.

List of Ordinaries

Vicar Apostolic of the Yorkshire District

Diocesan Bishops of Beverley

Titular Bishops and Archbishops of Beverley

See also 
 Bishop of Beverley (Anglican Provincial Episcopal Visitor)
 List of former cathedrals in Great Britain

References

Bibliography 

 

Christianity in the East Riding of Yorkshire
Beverley
Religious organizations established in 1850
Beverley
1850 establishments in England